A calculation is a deliberate mathematical process that transforms one or more inputs into one or more outputs or results. The term is used in a variety of senses, from the very definite arithmetical calculation of using an algorithm, to the vague heuristics of calculating a strategy in a competition, or calculating the chance of a successful relationship between two people.

For example, multiplying 7 by 6 is a simple algorithmic calculation. Extracting the square root or the cube root of a number using mathematical models is a more complex algorithmic calculation.
                                                                                        
Statistical estimations of the likely election results from opinion polls also involve algorithmic calculations, but produces ranges of possibilities rather than exact answers.

To calculate means to determine mathematically in the case of a number or amount, or in the case of an abstract problem to deduce the answer using logic, reason or common sense. The English word derives from the Latin calculus, which originally meant a small stone in the gall-bladder (from Latin calx). It also meant a pebble used for calculating, or a small stone used as a counter in an abacus (Latin abacus, Greek abax). The abacus was an instrument used by Greeks and Romans for arithmetic calculations, preceding the slide-rule and the electronic calculator, and consisted of perforated pebbles sliding on iron bars.

Calculation is a prerequisite for computation.

See also

 Calculus (disambiguation) — list of general methods of calculation by application area
 Complexity class — theoretical notion to categorize calculability
 Cost accounting — business application of calculation
 List of algorithms — fully formalized, computer-executable methods of calculation
 Mental calculation — performing arithmetics using one's brain only

References

External links

 "The Lifting of the Veil in the Operations of Calculation" is a manuscript, from the 18th-century, in Arabic, by Ibn al-Banna' al-Marrakushi, about calculation processes

Elementary arithmetic
Information